Far upstream element-binding protein 2 is a protein that in humans is encoded by the KHSRP gene.

References

Further reading